Harold Gustav "Hal" Dick (January 19, 1907 – September 3, 1997) was an American mechanical engineer employed by Goodyear, who flew on almost all of the Hindenburg flights. He was called to the UK for a meeting before the last flight of the Hindenburg and was not aboard during the disaster. Dick earned his balloon and dirigible pilot licenses in 1930, from Orville Wright.

Harold Dick was born in Lawrence, Massachusetts, and died in Wichita, Kansas, at the age of 90.

Works

References

External links 
 Harold G. Dick Airship Collection — biography of Harold G. Dick
 Postcards from Harold G. Dick Airship Collection Dick, Harold
 The Golden Age of the Great Passenger Airships: The Collection of Harold G. Dick

1907 births
1997 deaths
People from Lawrence, Massachusetts
American mechanical engineers
20th-century American engineers